Margalla Hills National Park is a national park in Pakistan located in Islamabad Capital Territory, near its northern boundary with Haripur District, Khyber Pakhtunkhwa. The park includes the Margalla Hills, which form the foothills of the Himalayas, along with Shakarparian Park and Rawal Lake.

Established in 1980, it is the third-largest national park in
Tilla Charouni, with a height of 1604 m, is tallest peak in the park. The Park is a major tourist destination, with Daman-e-Koh and Pir Sohawa serving as popular hill stations, while the Monal Restaurant, Shakarparian Cultural Complex, and Lake View Park are popular picnic spots.

The park is rich in biodiversity, especially rich in Sino-Himalayan fauna, most notably gray goral, barking deer and the leopard. Combined, MHNP is home to around 600 plant species, 402 bird varieties, 38 mammals, and 27 species of reptiles. PTDC is currently constructing a chairlift project in the park.

Location
Instituted in 1980, the Margalla Hills National Park comprises the Margalla Hills (12605 hectares), the Rawal Lake, and Shakarparian Sports and Cultural complex. Located in Islamabad, the capital of Pakistan. The hill range nestles between an elevation of 685 meters at the western end and 1,604 meters on its east.

Paleontology

Millions of years ago, these mountain peaks didn’t exist. The Asian continent was mostly intact, but the Indian subcontinent was an island floating off the coast of Australia. Around 220 million years ago, around the time that Pangaea was breaking apart, subcontinent started to move northwards. It travelled some 6,000 kilometers before it finally collided with Asia around 40 to 50 million years ago. Then, part of the Indian landmass began to go beneath the Asian one, moving the Asian landmass up, which resulted in the rise of the Himalayas. It is thought that India’s coastline was denser and more firmly attached to the seabed, which is why Asia’s softer soil was pushed up rather than the other way around. The rock formations are 40 million years old, and fossils of marine life abound, it is a clear indication that before the content collision around 40 to 50 Million years ago, these hills were the seabed of the ancient ocean. Fossils of seashells, plants, petrified wood and early sea life Yorgia waggoneri are abound.

These hills are the starting point of the Himalayas. The Himalayas, which stretch some 2,900 kilometers between Pakistan, India, China, and Nepal, is the world’s tallest mountain range.

Flora and fauna
The vegetation of the southern slopes is short stuttered, comprising deciduous and evergreen trees with diverse shrub growth. In the north, stand pines and groves of oak. The fauna is mainly Indo Himalayan, with some overlapping of Palearctic species. The birds found here are residents as well as winter migrants from higher altitudes of the north, spring and summer visitor for breeding, and short day transit species arrive in spring.

Margalla Hills have a number of torrents which gush down in the monsoon. Natural springs are also present. Margalla has a variety of mammals, which include:
 Indian leopard
 Jungle cat
 Leopard cat
 Central Asian boar
 Golden jackal
 White-footed fox
 Rhesus macaque
 Grey goral
 Muntjac (barking deer)
 Chinkara
 Indian pangolin
 Indian crested porcupine
 Yellow-throated marten
 Fruit-bat
 Indian flying fox
 Indian grey mongoose
 Javan mongoose
 Indian hedgehog
 Masked palm civet
 Asian palm civet
 Northern palm squirrel
 Kashmir flying squirrel
 Murree vole (endemic to Margalla Hills, Murree and Khyber Pakhtunkhwa)

It is also home to a large number of birds such as Himalayan vulture, laggar falcon, peregrine falcon, common kestrel, Eurasian sparrowhawk, Egyptian vulture, white-eared bulbul, yellow-vented bulbul, paradise flycatcher, black partridge, cheer pheasant, kalij pheasant, golden oriole, spotted dove, Eurasian collared dove, Eurasian skylark, steppe grey shrike, desert wheatear, white-capped bunting, crested bunting, common reed bunting, and rock bunting.

Reptiles such as the Russell's viper, Indian cobra, Himalayan pit viper, and saw-scaled viper are found here.

Flora 
Margalla Hills in Islamabad have been declared as a National Park since 1980 to conserve the existing flora and fauna. The selection of trees and shrubs species for plantation in Margalla Hills is limited to natural trees and plants species which include:

 Chir Pine (Pinus roxburghii)
 Olive (Olea ferruginea)
 Phulai (Senegalia modesta)
 Celtis (Celtis asustralis)
 Snatha (Dodonaea viscosa)

Major flowering trees include:

 Dhak (Butea frondosa)
 Punica (Punicum grantum)
 Pear (Pyrus pashia)
 Kachnar (Bauhinia variegate)
 Amaltas (Casia fistula)
 Jacarandra (Jacaranda mimosifolia)
 Woodfordia (Woodfordia fruticosa)
 Jasmine (Jasminum humile)
 Holmskioldia (Holmskiodia sanguine)

Conservation campaigns 
Himalayan Wildlife Foundation is running a project on a sustainable management strategy for the Margalla Hills National Park.

Margalla Hills Society, established in 1989, is a registered non-governmental organization with its head office in Islamabad. It is managed by an elected executive council. Its main objective is to preserve the natural environment of Margalla Hills National Park and prevent shrinkage of the green areas; to promote public interest in conservation, development and management of forests, wildlife and other natural resources of Margalla Hills National Park and to disseminate information about the Margalla Hills National park including its history, geography, flora, fauna culture and its benefits to the citizens of Islamabad.

Tourism, trekking and sports
The National Park is the most accessible in Pakistan due to its close proximity to the national capital, Islamabad. It is a significant hub for bird lovers throughout the year. There are several hiking trails (Trail 1, Trail 2, Trail 3, Trail 4, Trail 5, Trail 6, Trail 7 (Shah Allah Dittah)), with the most frequented being Trail 3 and Trail 5.

Rock climbing 
There are many spots for rock climbing in Margalla Hills. Few crags have been developed but there is still a lot of potential available to explore virgin lines.

For beginner level climbers, the following crags are suggested:

Although sport climbing is becoming increasingly popular among the youth of Rawalpindi and Islamabad, only few local climbers can climb at an advanced level. Therefore, most of the crags remain uncrowded.

Restaurants 
The most attractive spot in Margalla Hills National Park is the famous Monal Restaurant, which offers scenic view of Islamabad along with the lovely food and ambiance. People coming to Islamabad from different cities consider the restaurant as a must-visit place.

See also 
 Protected areas of Pakistan
 List of urban parks by size

References

External links
 Wildlife of Pakistan

National parks of Pakistan
Geography of Islamabad
Himalayan subtropical broadleaf forests
Nature reserves in Pakistan
Tourist attractions in Islamabad
Protected areas established in 1980
1980 establishments in Pakistan